is a railway station on the Yamada Line in the city of Morioka, Iwate, Japan, operated by the East Japan Railway Company (JR East).

Lines
Yamagishi Station is served by the Yamada Line, and is located 4.9 rail kilometers from the terminus of the line at Morioka Station.

Station layout
Yamagishi Station has a single side platform serving a single bi-directional track. The station is unattended.

History
Yamagishi Station opened on 10 February 1952. The station was absorbed into the JR East network upon the privatization of the Japanese National Railways (JNR) on 1 April 1987.

Surrounding area
 Iwate Prefectural Office
 Morioka City Zoo
 Nakatsu River

References

External links

  

Railway stations in Iwate Prefecture
Yamada Line (JR East)
Railway stations in Japan opened in 1952
Morioka, Iwate
Stations of East Japan Railway Company